Paris Is Always Paris is a 1951 Italian-French comedy film directed by Luciano Emmer. It was entered into the competition at the 12th Venice International Film Festival.

Cast
 Aldo Fabrizi as Andrea De Angelis
 Henri Guisol as Monsieur Morand
 Ave Ninchi as Elvira de Angelis
 Jeannette Batti as Claudia
 Hélène Rémy as Christine
 Henri Génès as Paul Gremier
 Marcello Mastroianni as Marcello Venturi
 Lucia Bosé as Mimi de Angelis
 Carlo Sposito as Toto Mancuso (credited as Carletto Sposito)
 Giuseppe Porelli as Raffaele D'Amore
 Janine Marsay as Praline
 Galeazzo Benti as Gianni Forlivesi
 Paolo Panelli as Nicolino Percuoco
 Franco Interlenghi as Franco Martini
 Yves Montand as himself
 Eartha Kitt as uncredited cameo as herself / cabaret singer
 Roland Lesaffre

References

External links

1951 films
1950s Italian-language films
1950s French-language films
1951 comedy films
French black-and-white films
Films directed by Luciano Emmer
Italian comedy films
French comedy films
Italian black-and-white films
1950s French films
1950s Italian films